Fuscaldo is a town and comune in the province of Cosenza in the Calabria region of southern Italy.

References

External links 
 Official website 

Cities and towns in Calabria